1947 in sports describes the year's events in world sport.

American football
 NFL Championship: the Chicago Cardinals won 28–21 over the Philadelphia Eagles at Comiskey Park
 Cleveland Browns beat the New York Yankees to win the AAFC championship.
 Notre Dame Fighting Irish – college football national championship

Association football
Colombia
 Atletico Nacional, officially founded in Medellín on March 7.
England
 First Division – Liverpool win the 1946-47 title.
 FA Cup – Charlton Athletic beat Burnley 1-0 after extra time
Spain
 La Liga won by Valencia
Italy
 Serie A won by Torino
Germany
 No major football is held due to the Allied occupation of Germany.
France
 French Division 1 won by CO Roubaix-Tourcoing
Portugal
 Primeira Liga won by Sporting C.P.
Romania
 Asociatia Sportiva an Armatei Bucuresti (Bucharest Army Sports Association FC), a predecessor for Steaua Bucharest FC, officially founded on June 7.

Australian rules football
Victorian Football League
 Carlton wins the 51st VFL Premiership, defeating Essendon 13.8 (86) to 11.19 (85) in the 1947 VFL Grand Final.
 Brownlow Medal awarded to Bert Deacon (Carlton)
South Australian National Football League
 4 October – West Adelaide win their sixth SANFL premiership, defeating Norwood 10.15 (75) to 5.15 (45)
 Magarey Medal awarded to Bob Hank (West Torrens)
Western Australian National Football League
 11 October – South Fremantle with their third WA(N)FL premiership but first since 1917, defeating West Perth 13.8 (86) to 9.17 (71)
 Sandover Medal awarded to Clive Lewington (South Fremantle)

Baseball
 January 20 – death of Josh Gibson (35), famed Negro leagues slugger
 Jackie Robinson becomes the first African-American baseball player in Major League Baseball.
 April 27 – Babe Ruth Day was celebrated all across the Major Leagues, with Babe himself appearing at Yankee Stadium. Although stricken with throat cancer, Ruth said to the audience: "The only real game I think in the world is baseball."
 World Series – New York Yankees beat Brooklyn Dodgers 4 games to 3.
 June 27–28 –  In the inaugural College World Series, California defeats Yale 2 games to 0 in the best-of-three series. The Yale team featured future U.S. President George Bush.
 Negro World Series – New York Cubans defeat the Cleveland Buckeyes, 4 games to 1.

Basketball
BAA (NBA) 
 Wataru Misaka of the New York Knicks became the first person of color to play in modern professional basketball, just months after Jackie Robinson had broken the color barrier in Major League Baseball for the Brooklyn Dodgers.
 In the Finals, the Philadelphia Warriors win four games to one over the Chicago Stags
NBL Championship
Chicago American Gears win three games to two over the Rochester Royals

Boxing
 Rocky Graziano defeats Tony Zale to win boxing's world middleweight championship.
 December 5 – Joe Louis defeats Jersey Joe Walcott to retain his heavyweight championship

Canadian football
 Grey Cup – Toronto Argonauts defeat Winnipeg Blue Bombers 10–9

Cricket
Events
 Denis Compton and Bill Edrich both beat Tom Hayward’s 1906 record of 3,518 runs in a first-class season.
 England tour Australia for the first Ashes series since 1938, losing three Tests to nil
 South Africa tour England for the first time since 1935, losing three Tests to nil
England
 County Championship – Middlesex
 Minor Counties Championship – Surrey Second Eleven
 Most runs – Denis Compton 3,816 @ 90.85 (HS 246)
 Most wickets – Tom Goddard 238 @ 17.38 (BB 9–41)
 Wisden Cricketers of the Year – Alan Melville, Norman Yardley, Martin Donnelly, Dudley Nourse, Jack Robertson
Australia
 Sheffield Shield – Victoria
 Most runs – Denis Compton 1,432 @ 65.09 (HS 163)
 Most wickets – Doug Wright 51 @ 33.31 (BB 7–105)
India
 Ranji Trophy – 7–11 March: Baroda defeated Holkar by an innings and 409 runs
New Zealand
 Plunket Shield – Auckland
South Africa
 Currie Cup – Western Province

Figure skating
 World Figure Skating Championship
 Men's champion: Hans Gerschwiler, Switzerland
 Ladies' champion: Barbara Ann Scott, Canada
 Pair skating champions: Micheline Lannoy & Pierre Baugniet, Belgium

Golf
Men's professional
 Masters Tournament – Jimmy Demaret
 U.S. Open – Lew Worsham
 PGA Championship – Jim Ferrier
 British Open – Fred Daly
Men's amateur
 British Amateur – Willie Turnesa
 U.S. Amateur – Skee Riegel
Women's professional
 Women's Western Open – Louise Suggs
 U.S. Women's Open – Betty Jameson
 Titleholders Championship – Babe Zaharias

Horse racing
Steeplechases
 Cheltenham Gold Cup – Fortina
 Grand National – Caughoo
Hurdle races
 Champion Hurdle – National Spirit
Flat races
 September 1, 1947: Calumet Farm of Lexington, Kentucky became the first stable in Thoroughbred racing history to surpass $1 million in annual earnings when Armed won the Washington Park Handicap.
 Australia – Melbourne Cup won by Hiraji
 Canada – King's Plate won by Moldy
 France – Prix de l'Arc de Triomphe won by Le Paillon
 Ireland – Irish Derby Stakes won by Sayajirao
 English Triple Crown Races:
 2,000 Guineas Stakes – Tudor Minstrel
 The Derby – Pearl Diver
 St. Leger Stakes –  Sayajirao
 United States Triple Crown Races:
 Kentucky Derby – Jet Pilot
 Preakness Stakes – Faultless.  This race is remembered for radio race caller Clem McCarthy declaring Jet Pilot the winner when in reality it was Faultless.
 Belmont Stakes – Phalanx

Ice hockey
 Toronto Maple Leafs defeat Montreal Canadiens 4 games to 2 to win the Stanley Cup. Ted "Teeder" Kennedy scores the match-winning goal late in game six to win the Maple Leafs their first of three straight Cups, the first time any NHL team has accomplished that feat.

Motorsport

Rowing
The Boat Race
 29 March — Cambridge wins the 93rd Oxford and Cambridge Boat Race

Rugby league
1946–47 European Rugby League Championship/1947–48 European Rugby League Championship
1947 New Zealand rugby league season
1947 NSWRFL season
1946–47 Northern Rugby Football League season/1947–48 Northern Rugby Football League season

Rugby union
Five Nations Championship
 53rd Five Nations Championship series is shared by England and Wales

Snooker
 World Snooker Championship – Walter Donaldson beats Fred Davis 82–63.

Speed skating
Speed Skating World Championships
 Men's All-round Champion – Lassi Parkkinen (Finland)
 Women's All-round Champion – Verné Lesche (Finland)

Tennis
Australia
 Australian Men's Singles Championship – Dinny Pails (Australia) defeats John Bromwich (Australia) 4–6, 6–4, 3–6, 7–5, 8–6
 Australian Women's Singles Championship – Nancye Wynne Bolton (Australia) defeats Nell Hall Hopman (Australia) 6–3, 6–2 
England
 Wimbledon Men's Singles Championship – Jack Kramer (USA) defeats Tom Brown (USA) 6–1, 6–3, 6–2 
 Wimbledon Women's Singles Championship – Margaret Osborne duPont (USA) defeats Doris Hart (USA) 6–2, 6–4 
France
 French Men's Singles Championship – József Asbóth (Hungary) defeats Eric Sturgess (South Africa) 8–6, 7–5, 6–4
 French Women's Singles Championship – Patricia Canning Todd (USA) defeats Doris Hart (USA) 6–3, 3–6, 6–4
USA
 American Men's Singles Championship – Jack Kramer (USA) defeats Frank Parker (USA) 4–6, 2–6, 6–1, 6–0, 6–3
 American Women's Singles Championship – Louise Brough Clapp (USA) defeated Margaret Osborne duPont (USA) 8–6, 4–6, 6–1
Davis Cup
 1947 Davis Cup –  4–1  at West Side Tennis Club (grass) New York City, United States

Awards
 Associated Press Male Athlete of the Year – Johnny Lujack, College football
 Associated Press Female Athlete of the Year – Babe Didrikson Zaharias, LPGA golf

References

 
Sports by year